Thomas Hendley may refer to:

 Thomas Holbein Hendley (1847–1917), British medical officer and amateur authority on Indian art
 Sir Thomas Hendley (1580–1656), English landholder